Meux may refer to:

People
 Edward Meux Worsley (1747–1782), British politician
 Hedworth Meux GCB, KCVO (1856–1929), British Royal Navy officer
 John Meux (died 1657), English politician
 Meux baronets, people who held titles in two separate baronetcies
 Richard Meux Benson (1824–1915), English priest
 Valerie, Lady Meux (1847–1910), American-born English socialite of the Victorian era
William Meux

Places
 Le Meux, commune in the Oise department in northern France
 Meux, Charente-Maritime, commune in the Charente-Maritime department in the Nouvelle-Aquitaine region in southwestern France
 Meux, Wallonia (fr), town and former municipality in La Bruyère, Belgium

Other
 Meux London ales, produced by the Horse Shoe Brewery